is a railway station on the Keiyō Line in Kōtō, Tokyo, Japan, operated by East Japan Railway Company (JR East).

Lines 
Shiomi Station is served by the Keiyō Line. This elevated station consists of a single island platform serving two tracks.

Platforms

History
The station opened on 10 March 1990.

Station numbering was introduced to the JR East platforms in 2016 with Shiomi being assigned station number JE04.

See also

 List of railway stations in Japan

References

External links
 Shiomi Station 

Railway stations in Tokyo
Stations of East Japan Railway Company
Railway stations in Japan opened in 1990